Chợ Gạo is a township and capital of Chợ Gạo District, Tiền Giang Province, Vietnam.

References

Populated places in Tiền Giang province
District capitals in Vietnam
Townships in Vietnam